The Pause may refer to:

 The Pause (story), 1954 science fiction short story by Isaac Asimov
 The Pause (novel), 2015 novel by John Larkin
 THEE PAUSE (born 1981), American recording artist known as !PAUS3